Bujorel Mocanu (11 May 1962 - 28 January 2011) was a Romanian footballer and manager.

Honours
Petrolul Ploiești
Divizia B: 1984–85, 1988–89

Notes

References

1962 births
2011 deaths
Romanian footballers
Association football midfielders
Liga I players
Liga II players
CSO Plopeni players
FC Gloria Buzău players
FC Petrolul Ploiești players
Romanian football managers
CSO Plopeni managers
People from Prahova County